Borovitsy (also Borovitsi, Polotsk Northwest, and Borovtsy) is an air base in Belarus, located 16 km northwest of Polatsk. It has a sprawling taxiway area and pads for about 40 aircraft. During the Soviet era, in the 1960s it was home to attack aircraft regiments, but by the 1980s it was served only by the 276th BVP (276th Combat Helicopter Regiment) flying Mi-8 and Mi-24 helicopters.

References
 RussianAirFields.com

Soviet Air Force bases